Brigadier General Segundo Francisco Imbert del Monte (Moca; 12 May 1837 – Puerto Plata; 16 October 1905) was a Dominican military figure and politician; he was Vice President of the Dominican Republic, Foreign minister, and was candidate for the Presidency of the Dominican Republic.

Imbert was born to José María Imbert (Frenchman) and María Francisca del Monte; he married Manuela Mesnier (whose father was French). He was the paternal grandfather of General Antonio Imbert Barrera.

References 

|-

1837 births
1905 deaths
Dominican Republic people of French descent
Dominican Republic military personnel
Vice presidents of the Dominican Republic
Foreign ministers of the Dominican Republic
People from Espaillat Province
White Dominicans